The Ministry of Commerce and Industry administers two departments, the Department of Commerce and the Department for Promotion of Industry & Internal Trade. The head of the Ministry is a Minister of Cabinet rank.

Minister of Commerce and Industry 

The Minister of Commerce and Industry is the head of the Ministry of Commerce and Industry and one of the cabinet ministers of the Government of India. The first Minister of Commerce and Industry of independent India was Syama Prasad Mukherjee. The current Minister is Piyush Goyal of the Bharatiya Janata Party. Goyal took over from Suresh Prabhu on 31 May 2019.

Past Ministers: Industry

Past Ministers: Commerce

Present : Commerce & Industry

List of Ministers of State

Department of Commerce 
The department is entrusted with formulating and implementing the foreign trade policy and responsibilities relating to multilateral and bilateral commercial relations, state trading, export promotion measures, and development and regulation of certain export oriented industries and commodities.

In order for the smooth functioning, the department is divided into eight divisions:
 Administrative and General Division
 Finance Division
 Economic Division
 Trade Policy Division
 Foreign Trade Territorial Division
 State Trading & Infrastructure Division
 Supply Division
 Plantation Division

The subjects under the administrative control of the Department include:
 International trade
 Foreign Trade
 State trading
 Management of Indian Trade Services
 Special Economic Zones

Department for Promotion of Industry and Internal Trade 

This department was established in the year 1995, and in the year 2000 Department of Industrial Development was merged with it. This department is responsible for formulation and implementation of promotional and developmental measures for growth of the industrial sector, keeping in view the national priorities and socio-economic objectives. While individual administrative ministries look after the production, distribution, development and planning aspects of specific industries allocated to them, Department for Promotion of Industry and Internal Trade is responsible for the overall Industrial Policy. It is also responsible for facilitating and increasing the FDI flows to the country. It is also responsible to calculate WPI (I.e. Wholesale Price Index).

The Department for Promotion of Industry and Internal Trade is also responsible for intellectual property rights relating to patents, designs, trademarks, copyrights and geographical indication of goods and oversees the initiative relating to their promotion and protection.

Recently instituted National Startup Award by ministry of commerce and industry recognised 46 startups  on the eve of First National Startup Day announced by Hon'ble Prime Minister Narendra Modi. udChalo, Ratan Tata backed Repos and others remarkable startups  are among the winners.

References

External links
Department of Commerce
Department for Promotion of Industry and Internal Trade

 
Commerce and Industry
Anti-dumping authorities
India